Iran Airtour (Iran Airtur) is an airline based in Tehran, Iran. Iran Airtour's hubs are at Mehrabad International Airport and Mashhad International Airport. In total, the group has 11 aircraft in service. It operates scheduled domestic and international passenger service, Iran Airtours is one of IATA members in Iran and has IATA Operational Safety Audit (IOSA) certificate.

History
Iran Airtour is one of Iran's private airlines, established in 1973 by Iran Air (Persian: هواپیمایی جمهوری اسلامی ایران) with the aim of launching tours to the cities of Iran and different countries in addition to Iran's national airline.

From 1982, Iran Airtour Airline started scheduled domestic tours from all over Iran to the holy city of Mashhad. Two years later, Airline started to develop foreign tours to countries such as China, UAE, India, Singapore and Malaysia.

In addition, it is aimed at developing tourism and attracting tourists from other countries by organizing seminars with the company managers and officials of tourist companies. As a result, the airline was awarded honors from various countries such as Germany, France, Italy, Japan, Switzerland, Austria, United Kingdom, United Arab Emirates, Bahrain and Kuwait.

Iran Airtour's flight activity as an independent airline started in 1992 in Mashhad, which became the operations center of the airline. A direct air link from Mashhad to the centers of 13 provinces ensued. Iran Airtour Airline was also responsible for operating 55% of flights from different cities to the Holy City of Mecca for pilgrimage, as well as regional flights with 19 aircraft to Damascus, Stockholm, Moscow, and Ashgabat.

Until 2010, Iran Airtour was one of the state-owned airline companies in Iran, but subsequently in accordance with Article 44 of the Constitutional law, ownership was assigned to Hesayar Co., a subsidiary of the Iranian Ministry of Defence. Because four of five consecutive payment checks from Hesayar Co. were returned for insufficient funds, the original assignment was canceled. After another auction in 2016 the airline was conceded to the private sector.

In October 2021, Iran Airtours was given permission to fly in European Airspace, Making it the second Iranian Airline to be able to do. this lead the Airline to plan on starting European destination.

Destinations

As of September 2022 Iran Airtour operates scheduled services to the following destinations.

Fleet
As of May 14, 2020 the Iran Airtour fleet consisted of the following aircraft.

Accidents and incidents
As of 1993, Iran AirTour has had three fatal aircraft accidents.

 On February 8, 1993, a Tupolev Tu-154, Iran Airtour Flight 962, shortly after departure from Tehran International Airport, crashed into a Sukhoi Su-24 fighter of the Iranian Air Force which was landing. In this accident all 133 people – both pilots of the Su-24 and Tu-154, all 12 crew members and 119 passengers on board – died. The main cause of this accident was the Sukhoi Su-24 fighter pilot's error.
 On February 12, 2002, a Tupolev Tu-154, Iran Airtour Flight 956, flying from Tehran to Khorramabad, crashed into the Sefid Kooh mountains during heavy rain, snow and dense fog.  All 12 crew members and 107 passengers died.
 On September 1, 2006, a Tupolev Tu-154, Iran Airtour Flight 945, flying from Bandar Abbas to Mashhad, with 11 crew and 137 passengers on board, burst into flames upon landing at Mashhad International Airport, 28 out of the 148  passengers and crew died.

See also
 List of airlines of Iran

References 

 https://www.zoomg.ir/2019/3/27/302707/iran-air-tour-info/
 https://ipo.ir/index.jsp?pageid=1266
 https://iranairtour.ir/destinations 
 https://iranairtour.ir/fleet 
 https://www.cannews.aero/بخش-سوانح-حوادث-3/3144-برخورد-توپولف-ا
 https://www.airlinepress.ir/46920/بازخوانی-سقوط-توپولف-۱۵۴-ایران-ایرتور-3/
 http://www.hormoz.ir/۱۰شهریور-۱۳۸۵-سانحه-برای-توپولف-۱۵۴-بن/

External links

Iran Airtour
Iran Airtour
Iran Airtour
Iranian companies established in 1973